Law Hill is a hill in the North Ayrshire town of West Kilbride, overlooking the Firth of Clyde and the hills of Arran beyond. The summit rises above the village, with nearby Law Castle a few minutes walk away.

On the farm road which approaches the peak, there are a number of green huts which are used as holiday dwellings or allotments. Huts of this type were first used as retreats for military servicemen and are now commonly used by families and pensioners, although their number in Scotland has declined.

The summit of Law Hill is capped with a large radio tower which belongs to Arqiva.

References

Mountains and hills of North Ayrshire